Martin Spiess is a Swiss Biochemist and former professor at the Biozentrum University of Basel, Switzerland.

Life 
Martin Spiess studied and graduated with a doctorate in biochemistry at the ETH Zurich. In 1983 he began research as a postdoc at the Massachusetts Institute of Technology and the Whitehead Institute in Cambridge, USA, returning in 1985 to the ETH Zurich. In 1986 he was appointed assistant professor at the Biozentrum of the University of Basel, where he has taught and conducted research as associate professor since 1993 and as professor of biochemistry from 2004 to 2021. From 2010 to 2012, Spiess served as Dean of the Faculty of Science.

Work 
Martin Spiess investigates topogenesis and the intracellular transport of membrane proteins in eukaryotic cells. He studies the mechanism of translocon function and how proteins are sorted in the cell and transported to their designated organelles. 
Spiess discovered that the translocon, in particular the asymmetric polarity along the pore, determines the thermodynamic equilibrium between integration of individual proteins segments into the cell membrane and their further transport. Further studies demonstrated that the orientation of transmembrane segments are defined through the flanking charges, the folding of neighboring segments as well as the hydrophobic properties of the sequences themselves.

Awards and honors 
1989 FEBS Anniversary Prize of the Society for Biochemistry and Molecular Biology (GBM)
1991 Helmut Horten Incentive Prize
1997 Elected Member of the European Molecular Biology Organization (EMBO)

References

External links 

Living people
Swiss biochemists
Massachusetts Institute of Technology alumni
ETH Zurich alumni
Biozentrum University of Basel
University of Basel alumni
Year of birth missing (living people)